Le Creux ès Faïes is a neolithic chamber tomb on Guernsey, the Channel Islands.

References

Burial monuments and structures
Buildings and structures in Guernsey